Newtowncloghoge is a small village in County Armagh, Northern Ireland. In the 2001 Census it had a population of 357 people. It lies within the Newry and Mourne District Council area, west of the A1 road.

References 
NI Neighbourhood Information System

See also 
List of villages in Northern Ireland
List of towns in Northern Ireland

Villages in County Armagh